The Act 15 Geo 2 c 25, sometimes called the Spirit Duties, etc. Act 1741, was an Act of the Parliament of Great Britain. It was passed in 1742, came into force from 29 September 1742, and was expressly repealed in 1867. It allowed rum brought from the colonies to be stored on shore before the excise duty was paid.

Aims
The Act aimed to simplify the importation of spirits.  Previously, it was required to pay the excise duties on the entire shipment before it could be landed and sold. This meant that any delay in organising payment would require the ship carrying the spirits to remain in port until the cargo was cleared, both straining the capacity of the harbour and leaving the merchant with the additional costs of chartering the ship longer than anticipated. In order to avoid this, it was enacted that the cargo could be offloaded into specified secure warehouses on shore, at the importers' expense, if they gave their bond or security for the value of the duties. Duties would then be collected by the excise officers on the cargo as it was sold from the warehouses; if any remained unsold after six months from landing, the remaining duty was payable on it as a lump sum on that date.

Conditions
The remainder of the Act laid down the various conditions for the operations of these warehouses. Any spirits landed without warrant from the customs officials were to be forfeited, with half to the Crown and half to the informer. All spirits held were to be fully documented, and not sold in quantities under a twenty-gallon cask.

Period of operation
The Act was in force from 29 September 1742 to 29 September 1749, when it was continued by the Continuance of Acts Act 1749. It was expressly repealed by the Statute Law Revision Act 1867.

Section 11
Section 11 of the Act was not concerned with the importation of spirits, but instead served to discharge the liability on one Ralph Barrow of Northwich for the duties payable on seventeen tons of rock salt which had been lost to flooding in Cheshire in December 1740.

References
Ruffhead and Runnington. The Statutes at Large. 1786. Volume 6. Pages 181 to 183.
John Raithby (ed). The Statutes at Large. 1811. Volume 9. Pages 766 to 770.
Danby Pickering. The Statutes at Large. 1765. Volume 18. Pages 38 to 43.
The Statutes at Large from the 15th to the 20th Year of King George III. Charles Bathurst. London. 1765. Volume XVIII.
Chronological Table of the Statutes. HMSO. London. 1993. .
Journals of the House of Commons. 1803. Volume 24 (25 June 1741 to 19 September 1745). Pages 273, 276, 280, 281, 283, 288 and 334. Volume 51 (29 October 1795 to 19 May 1796). Page 747.
Report from the Committee upon Expired and Expiring Laws. For 47 Geo III. 1806. Page 12. For 48 Geo III. 1808. Page 12.
Statute Law Revision Bill (154). Ordered to be printed 12 June 1866. Page 159.
Remarks on several Acts of Parliament, relating more especially to the Colonies abroad, as also on diverse Acts of Assemblies there. Attributed to Jonathan Blenman or Richard Blenman. Printed for T Cooper. London. 1742. Arno Press. Reprinted 1972. Research Library of Colonial America. Chapter 4 ("On the Statute of 15 & 16 Geo II - To impower the Importers . . ."). Catalogue by Hanson. Catalogue by Sabin.
Timothy Cunningham and John, Viscount Dudley and Ward. The Law of a Justice of Peace and Parish Officer. 1769. Volume 2. Pages 62 and 63.
Burn's Justice of the Peace and Parish Officer. 29th Edition. 1845. Volume 2. Page 499. The Justice of the Peace and Parish Officer. 28th Edition. 1837. Volume 2. Page 146.
Rice v Denton (1773) Lofft 204, (1773) 98 ER 611
John Wentworth. A Complete System of Pleading: Comprehending. Dublin. 1799. Volume 4. Page 511.
Stephen Dowell. History of Taxation and Taxes in England. 1884. Page 223. Second Edition. 1888. Volume 4. Pages 198 and 199.
George Joseph Bell. Commentaries on the Laws of Scotland. Second Edition. 1810. Appendix. Page xliii.
Robert Bell and William Bell. A Dictionary of the Law of Scotland. Third Edition. 1826. Volume 2. Page 564.
William Addington. An Abridgment of Penal Statutes. Second Edition. London. 1782. Pages 530 and 539.
Thomas Walter Williams. A Compendious Digest of the Statute Law. Second Edition. 1788. Pages 161 and 195.
Thomas Walter Williams. The Whole Law Relative to the Duty and Office of a Justice of the Peace. 1808. Volume 2. Page 28.
Samuel Baldwin. A Survey of the British Customs. 1770. Page 226.

Repealed Great Britain Acts of Parliament
Alcohol law in the United Kingdom
Great Britain Acts of Parliament 1741